Christopher Francis Rivers de Hamel  (born 20 November 1950) is a British academic librarian and expert on mediaeval manuscripts. He is a Fellow of Corpus Christi College, Cambridge, and former Fellow Librarian of the Parker Library. His book Meetings with Remarkable Manuscripts is the winner of the Duff Cooper Prize for 2016 and the Wolfson History Prize for 2017.

Early life and education
Christopher de Hamel was born on 20 November 1950 in London, England. At the age of four he moved with his parents to New Zealand, where he was educated at King's High School, Dunedin, and graduated with an honours degree in history from the University of Otago.

He was subsequently awarded a Doctor of Philosophy (DPhil) degree by Oxford University for his research on 12th-century Bible commentaries. His thesis was titled "The production and circulation of glossed books of the Bible in the twelfth and early thirteenth centuries". He has been awarded honorary Doctorates of Letters from the University of Otago and from St. John’s University, Minnesota.

Career
Between 1975 and 2000 de Hamel worked for Sotheby’s in its Western Manuscripts Department. He was elected as the Donnelley Fellow Librarian of Corpus Christi College, Cambridge in 2000, and elected a member of the Roxburghe Club the following year. De Hamel delivered the 2009 Lyell Lectures at Oxford University on the subject of "Fragments in Book Bindings". In 2017, his then-newly-published Meetings with Remarkable Manuscripts was shortlisted for Waterstones Book of the Year 2016, and won both the £40,000 Wolfson History Prize and the Duff Cooper Prize.

De Hamel has formed a collection of manuscripts, the Christopher de Hamel Collection, located in Cambridge, England.

Published works
De Hamel has written a number of historical works within his field of expertise:

Geoffrey Chaucer - Prologue to the Canterbury Tales - A Hitherto Unrecorded Variant Reading", Privately Printed, 1980A History of Illuminated Manuscripts (Phaidon, 1986; second revised edition, 1994)
 Syon Abbey, The library of the Bridgettine Nuns and their Peregrinations after the Reformation (Roxburghe Club, 1991)
 Scribes and Illuminators (British Museum, 1992)
 The Book: a History of the Bible (Phaidon, 2001)
 The Rothschilds and their Collections of Illuminated Manuscripts (British Library, 2005)The Macclesfield Alphabet Book: a facsimile (2010) with Patricia Lovett
 Gilding the Lilly: a Hundred Medieval and Illuminated Manuscripts in the Lilly Library (Lilly Library, Indiana University, 2010)
 Meetings with Remarkable Manuscripts (Allen Lane, 2016)
 Making Medieval Manuscripts (Bodleian Library, University of Oxford 2018)
 The Posthumous Papers of the Manuscripts Club'' (Allen Lane, 2022)

References

Living people
Fellows of Corpus Christi College, Cambridge
University of Otago alumni
People educated at King's High School, Dunedin
Academic librarians
English palaeographers
New Zealand palaeographers
1950 births
Fellows of the Royal Historical Society
People associated with the Oxford University Society of Bibliophiles